Shirley Machaba is a South African chartered accountant. She is the first black woman to be appointed Chief Executive Officer for PwC Southern Africa, an accounting firm in South Africa.

Early years 
Machaba was born in Jabavu in Soweto, where she lived with her grandmother and siblings.

Education 
She had her primary education and secondary education at Jabavu Primary School and Vhulaudzi Secondary School in Tshitavha in Venda respectively. She later furthered at the University of Venda, where she graduated with a bachelor of commerce degree in accounting. She holds a postgraduate diploma in auditing & accounting from the University of South Africa. She holds two additional diplomas in Integrated Reporting from the University of Pretoria and Corporate Governance from Duke University.

Career 
After acquiring her degree, she worked part time as a junior internal auditor at the Auditor-General’s office and a lecturer at the University of Venda.  In May 2019, she was appointed Chief Executive Officer for PwC Southern Africa, making her the first black African woman to occupy such position.

Prior to that, spent nearly a decade working at the Auditor-General's office occupying a variety of positions, including Assistant Auditor, Senior Auditor, Accountant and Performance Audit Manager. She also worked at the Department of Justice in South Africa for nearly half a decade. There, she became the Head of the Internal Auditing unit by the time she left the department in 2004. In 2005 she joined PwC.

Machaba was president of the Institute of Internal Auditors of South Africa for 2011 - 2014, and subsequently the Chairman of the Institute Relations Committee of the Institute of Internal Auditors.

Awards 
Some of the awards she has won and been nominated for include:

 2013 - She was a finalist in the Africa’s Most Influential Women in Business and Government awards
 2016 - She was honoured as Audit Partner of the Year by African Women Chartered Accountants 
 2018 - She was honoured  as one of the Big 4 Professional of the Year by the South African Professional Services Awards
 2018 - She was awarded the overall ‘Woman Professional of the Year’ by the South African Professional Services Awards. 
 2018 - She is also a nominee for the 2018 Business Women of the Year BWA award to be announced before the end of the year

References

Living people
South African accountants
21st-century South African businesswomen
21st-century South African businesspeople
University of South Africa alumni
University of Pretoria alumni
People from Soweto
Year of birth missing (living people)